Verkh-Buzhdom is a rural locality (a settlement) in Verkh-Invenskoye Rural Settlement, Kudymkarsky District, Perm Krai, Russia. The population was 265 as of 2010. There are 19 streets.

Geography 
Verkh-Buzhdom is located 52 km west of Kudymkar (the district's administrative centre) by road. Ganina is the nearest rural locality.

References 

Rural localities in Kudymkarsky District